The Islamic Tharikah Unity Party (PPTI) was an Islamic political party in Indonesia. In the 1955 parliamentary election, PPTI got 85,131 votes (0.2% of the national vote). One parliamentarian was elected from the party.

References

Defunct political parties in Indonesia
Islamic political parties in Indonesia
Political parties with year of disestablishment missing
Political parties with year of establishment missing